Commerce de Marseille was a 118-gun ship of the line of the French Navy, lead ship of the . She was funded by a don des vaisseaux donation from the chamber of commerce of Marseille.

Career 

Built on state-of-the-art plans by Sané, she was dubbed the "finest ship of the century". Her construction was difficult because of a lack of wood, and soon after her completion, she was disarmed, in March 1791.

Commerce de Marseille came under British control during the Siege of Toulon. When the city fell to the French, she evacuated the harbour for Portsmouth. She was briefly used as a stores ship, but on a journey to the Caribbean Sea, in 1795, she was badly damaged in a storm and had to limp back to Portsmouth. She remained there as a hulk until she was broken up in 1802.

Notes and references

Notes

References

Bibliography 
 "Le vaisseau trois-ponts l’Océan", Jean Boudriot, in Neptunia n° 102 (1971), page 21.
 
  (1671-1870)

Ships of the line of the French Navy
Océan-class ships of the line
1788 ships
Don des vaisseaux
Captured ships